The Chief of the General Staff is the head of the General Staff of the Ukrainian Armed Forces, the military staff of the Forces. He/she is appointed by the President of Ukraine.

Since a decree by President Volodymyr Zelenskyy on 28 March 2020, the posts of Chief of the General Staff and Commander-in-Chief of the Armed Forces have been separate. Previously  the Chief of the General Staff also served as the Commander-in-Chief when a civilian was the Minister of Defense (before 1 January 2019 it was not a requirement that the Minister of Defense be a civilian).

The current Chief of the General Staff is Serhiy Shaptala.

Chiefs of General Staff

Armed Forces of Ukraine
The office created upon the reorganization of the Soviet Kyiv Military District when its head, Colonel General Viktor Chechevatov, after receiving the offer to be appointed to the post, refused to pledge his allegiance to the Ukrainian people. Originally it was known as Chief of the Headquarters and was designated as the First Deputy of the Minister of Defense. In 1996 it was changed to Chief of the General Staff. In 2002 as part of military reform, the post was separated from the civil service and lost its ministerial deputy functions. In 2005 Chief of the General Staff was reaffirmed as the primary commander of the Armed Forces in the country and was granted a parallel post of Commander-in-Chief. In 2020 another reorganization took place as part of ongoing military reform triggered by the Russian aggression and the post of Commander-in-Chief was split into a separate post.

Historical offices

Ukrainian People's Republic
Ukrainian General Staff

Headquarters of the UPR

General Staff of UPR

West Ukrainian National Republic

Notes

References

 
Military chiefs of staff